Scythopolis may refer to :

 an Ancient city in Israel, on the site of modern Beit She'an 
 Scythopolis (see) its former archbishopric, now a Catholic Metropolitan titular see (also referred to as Scitopoli)